Adelpha justina is a species of butterfly of the family Nymphalidae.

Description
The uppersides of the wings are generally brown, with an orange band crossing the forewings and a large white spot or band in the hindwings. The undersides are quite similar to the uppersides, with paler colours.

Distribution
This species occurs from Guatemala to Peru, in Venezuela and in Colombia, at elevations of 600 to 1900 m above sea level.

Subspecies
A. j. justina (Colombia)
A. j. justinella Fruhstorfer, 1907 (Venezuela)
A. j. valentina Fruhstorfer, 1915 (Colombia, Bolivia, Ecuador, Peru)
A. j. maira Orellana, 1996 (Venezuela)
A. j. inesae Orellana, 1996 (Venezuela)

References

"Adelpha Hübner, [1819]" at Markku Savela's Lepidoptera and Some Other Life Forms
BioLib.cz

External links
Neotropical butterflies
Adelpha justina
Butterflies of America

Adelpha
Nymphalidae of South America
Butterflies described in 1861
Taxa named by Baron Cajetan von Felder
Taxa named by Rudolf Felder